Janice Bolland (born January 25, 1966) is an American road racing cyclist. She won a gold medal at the 1992 UCI Road World Championships in the team time trial and a silver medal in the team time trial in 1993.

References

External links
 

1966 births
Living people
American female cyclists
UCI Road World Champions (women)
Pan American Games medalists in cycling
Pan American Games bronze medalists for the United States
Cyclists at the 1991 Pan American Games
Medalists at the 1991 Pan American Games
21st-century American women
Cyclists from Wyoming
20th-century American women